
Gmina Chojnice is a rural gmina (administrative district) in Chojnice County, Pomeranian Voivodeship, in northern Poland. Its seat is the town of Chojnice, although the town is not part of the territory of the gmina.

The gmina contains parts of the protected areas of Tuchola Landscape Park and Zaborski Landscape Park.

Villages
Gmina Chojnice contains the villages and settlements of Angowice, Babilon, Bachorze, Białe Błota, Borne, Charzykowy, Chiny, Chociński Młyn, Chojnaty, Chojniczki, Chojniczki-Wybudowanie, Ciechocin, Cołdanki, Czartołomie, Dębowa Góra, Doręgowice, Drzewicz, Funka, Gockowice, Granowo, Grzampki, Jabłonka, Jakubowo, Jarcewo, Jasnowo, Jeziorki, Józefowo, Kamionka, Kamionka nad jeziorem Zamarte, Karolewo, Klawkowo, Kłodawa, Kłodawka, Klosnowo, Klucza, Kokoszka, Kopernica, Kopernica nad Jeziorem, Krojanty, Kruszka, Kulki, Lichnowy, Lipienice, Lotyń, Łukomie, Małe Swornegacie, Małe Zanie, Melanówek, Melanowo, Moszczenica, Nicponie, Nieżychowice, Nieżychowice-Wybudowanie, Nowa Cerkiew, Nowa Cerkiew Szlachetna, Nowy Dwór, Objezierze, Ogorzeliny, Osiedle Słoneczne, Ostrowite, Ostrowite ZR, Owink, Pawłówko, Pawłowo, Pawłowo-Wybudowanie, Płęsno, Pomoc, Powałki, Racławki, Sepiot, Silno, Sławęcin, Śluza, Stary Młyn, Sternowo, Strużka, Styporc, Swornegacie, Topole, Wączos, Wielkie Zanie, Władysławek, Wolność, Zbeniny and Zbrzyca.

Neighbouring gminas
Gmina Chojnice is bordered by the gminas of Brusy, Czersk, Człuchów, Kamień Krajeński, Kęsowo, Konarzyny, Lipnica and Tuchola.

References
 Polish official population figures 2006

Chojnice
Chojnice County